The Persian turpentine tree may refer to:
Pistacia eurycarpa
Pistacia atlantica